Sgt. Ernesto 'Boy' Ybañez: Tirtir Gang, or simply Tirtir Gang, is a 1988 Philippine action film co-written and directed by Willy Milan. The film stars Sonny Parsons as the titular character. Produced by Double M Films International, the film was released on July 28, 1988.

Critic Lav Diaz gave Tirtir Gang a negative review, criticizing its confusing characterizations and implausible action scenes which undercuts its assertion of being based on true events.

Cast

Sonny Parsons as Sgt. Ernesto 'Boy' Ybañez
Eddie Garcia as Greg
Vivian Foz as Chedeng
Charlie Davao as Waldo
Romy Diaz as Sgt. Macaroyo
Lucita Soriano as Coching
Carol Dauden as Grace
Renato del Prado as Tata
Roland Dantes as Col. Nabiula
Ross Olgado as Col. Cruz
Mario Escudero as a police reporter
Usman Hassim as Erning Bakal
Robert Miller as Robert
Pons de Guzman as a judge
Fred Moro as a gang leader
Marco Polo as Tisoy
Fernan Morato as Henry
Garry Garcia as Garry
Manny Doria as Manny
Ben 'Pinoy' Sagmit as Ben Bisay
Bong Varona as Bong
Arlan Israel as Rolando
Robert Talby as Roberto
Tom Alvarez as Tommy
Carlos David as Caloy
Ver Rodriguez as Virgilio
Stanley Orong as Stanley
Arnold Esguerra as Arnold
Rusty Santos as Gen. Ramos

Release
Tirtir Gang was released on July 28, 1988.

Critical response
Lav Diaz, writing for the Manila Standard, gave Tirtir Gang a negative review. He criticized the film's confusing depiction of its characters, highlighting the main character Ybañez as being depicted a good man but is shown throughout the story hanging around his criminal friends, neglecting his family, and committing adultery with a hostess, resulting in an unconvincing film. Diaz also noted that because the film is based on a true story, the excessive action scenes and the implausible depiction of a tactically poor Sparrow Unit, a revolutionary group of the New People's Army, negatively underscores the artistic liberties taken by the film.

References

External links

1988 films
1980s crime action films
Action films based on actual events
Crime films based on actual events
Filipino-language films
Philippine crime action films
Films directed by Willy Milan